Peter John Warfield is a former rugby union international who represented England in both the 1973 Five Nations and 1975 Five Nations tournaments.

Personal

Warfield attended Haileybury and Imperial Service College and earned a two-year scholarship to the University of North Carolina. He matriculated at Durham University (Hatfield College) in 1971 to read for the General Arts course, where he competed for Durham University RFC and received a full palatinate. He continued his education at St John's College, Cambridge, earning a PGCE in 1975.

Rugby union career
Warfield, a centre, made his test debut against New Zealand on 6 January 1973. He earned 6 international caps in total, with his only win coming against Scotland at Twickenham during the 1975 Five Nations. He played his club rugby for Rosslyn Park.

References

External links
 

1951 births
Living people
English rugby union players
England international rugby union players
Rosslyn Park F.C. players
Rugby union players from Lincolnshire
Durham University RFC players
People educated at Haileybury and Imperial Service College
Alumni of Hatfield College, Durham
University of North Carolina alumni
Cambridge University R.U.F.C. players
Alumni of St John's College, Cambridge
Rugby union centres